Yiwu is a town in Mengla County, Xishuangbanna prefecture, Yunnan province, China, bordering Laos's Phôngsali to the east.

Yiwu was established as a township in 1988. It merged Manla Township on 30 September 2004, and was re-organized as a town in January 2015.

References 

Township-level divisions of Xishuangbanna Dai Autonomous Prefecture